Pratish GC (born May 22, 2004) is a Nepalese cricketer. He is an all-rounder who made his ODI debut during Nepal's tour of the United Arab Emirates for the 2019–2023 ICC Cricket World Cup League 2 tournament, playing against Papua New Guinea on February 27, 2023.

References

Cricket in Nepal
Cricketers
Nepalese cricket people